Tatakooti or Tatakuti, Peak is a mountain with a peak  elevation of , on the border of Budgam and Poonch districts of Jammu and Kashmir, India. The most conspicuous and imposing peak of Pir Panjal range is undoubtedly Tatakooti. Tatakooti, along with Sunset Peak, lies south west of the Kashmir valley. It is located 40 km west of Shopian town and 105 km southwest of Srinagar, the summer capital of Jammu and Kashmir. It is the highest peak of the Pir Panjal bounding Kashmir from SW.

Early exploration of the Pirpanjal Range was carried by Thomas Montgomerie and Godwin Austen in 1856. The first ascent of Tatakooti peak was made in 1901 by C. E. Barton and Dr Ernest Neve. In 2018 a local Kashmiri adventure club, Alpine Adventurers led by Aadil Shah summited the southern summit of the peak. The main peak was still waiting for the ascent and in 2021, a team of Jawahar Institute of Mountaineering and Winter Sports led by Everester Iqbal Khan, Everester Mahfooz illahi, Ajay chauhan climbed the main peak. Then on 24 Sept 2022 (10:12am IST), a 9 member team of Jammu Kashmir Mountaineering and Adventure Club(JKMAC) https://www.jkmac.club/ made the third successful ascent of the peak. It was the first civilian summit of the peak led by Gh. Mohd Wani and Arashid Majid. The other team members were Zeeshan Mushtaq, Taous Baba, Hazik Beigh, Khurshid Beigh, Mohsin Farooq, Tanvir Dar and Mudasir Bashir Shah.

On October 16th 2022 , joint expedition of All Jammu Kashmir Mountaineering Foundation , The North Col and Hike The Trails Adventures Pvt. Ltd. https://httadventures.com/ a group of 8 mountaineers led by Everester Mohd. Iqbal Khan scaled Tatakooti Peak at 11:30 a.m. It was second summit of Everester Mohd. Iqbal Khan as a lead climber, first in 2021. Other mountaineers were Muazzam Ahsan, Inayat ullah Bhat, Danish Dhaar, Waseem Hassan, Faizan Shafi, Amir Lateef Dar and Arundhati Sharma.

References

Climbing areas of India
Mountains of Jammu and Kashmir